Hypsopygia superba is a species of snout moth in the genus Hypsopygia. It was described by Aristide Caradja in 1934. It is found in China.

References

Moths described in 1934
Pyralini